This is a list of films which ranked number one at the weekend box office for the year 2022.

Number-one films

Highest-grossing films

Calendar gross
Highest-grossing films of 2022 by Calendar Gross

In-Year Release

See also
 Lists of American films — American films by year
 Lists of box office number-one films

References

Chronology

2022 in American cinema
2022
United States